George Rainsford (born 31 July 1982) is a British actor, best known for his portrayal of Jimmy Wilson in the medical drama Call the Midwife and Ethan Hardy in Casualty, for which he has been nominated for a Best Actor award in the 2017 TV Choice Awards.

Early life
Rainsford was born in Huddersfield, West Yorkshire. He attended Repton School in Repton, Derbyshire, where he became interested in drama. Whilst reading for a Bachelor of Arts in drama at the University of Manchester, he was involved with the student theatre. He joined the National Youth Theatre in June 2003 and won a Goldman Sachs scholarship to the London Academy of Music and Dramatic Art. After graduating in 2006, he appeared in The Three Musketeers as D'Artagnan at Bristol Old Vic.

Career
He appeared in the first two series of the medical drama Call The Midwife, as Jimmy Wilson. 

In September 2013, it was announced that Rainsford would join the main cast of Casualty as Dr Ethan Hardy. He took part in an audition in London and a screen test in Cardiff with Richard Winsor.

In November 2022, it was confirmed in a Metro Soaps interview with Casualty executive producer, Jon Sen, that Rainsford had exited his role as Ethan Hardy on after nine years on the program, however, the door would be left open for Rainsford to return in the future, with Sen confirming that it wouldn't be a permanent exit from the program for Rainsford.

Personal life
In November 2009, Rainsford was treated at Salisbury District Hospital for a gashed fist and damaged tendon after accidentally punching Luke Norris during a stage fight in the Royal Shakespeare Company production Days of Significance.

In the summer of 2014, Rainsford took three episodes of Casualty off due to paternity leave. His last episode of 2014 was aired on 29 November, and he returned at the start of 2015.

He married actress Jaimi Barbakoff in 2012 and they have two sons. They met at the National Theatre.

Filmography

Video games

Stage

References

External links
 
 George Rainsford on Bertram

1982 births
Alumni of the London Academy of Music and Dramatic Art
Alumni of the University of Manchester
English male film actors
English male soap opera actors
Living people
Male actors from Huddersfield
National Youth Theatre members
People educated at Repton School